David Vaughan is an American businessman and politician who is serving as a member of the South Carolina House of Representatives from the 27th district. He is a Republican.

Early life and education

David Vaughan was born in Greenville, South Carolina. In 1987, he graduated from the University of South Carolina with a Bachelor of Science degree.

Career

In 1996, Vaughan became a business owner by constructing self-storage units around the Greenville area. 

Vaughan won the June 2022 Republican primary with 52% of the vote, and won the general election unopposed. He succeeded Garry R. Smith, who had held the office since 2003 and did not seek reelection. Vaughan assumed office on December 6, 2022.

Vaughn serves on the House Education and Public Works Committee.

In 2023, Vaughan was briefly among the Republican co-sponsors of the South Carolina Prenatal Equal Protection Act of 2023, which would make women who had abortions eligible for the death penalty; he later withdrew his sponsorship, telling NBC News he had "signed on that bill in Error".

References

Living people
1965 births
University of South Carolina alumni
People from Greenville, South Carolina
Republican Party members of the South Carolina House of Representatives
21st-century American politicians